HMS Crispin was a British cargo steamship that was launched in England in 1934 and operated by Alfred Booth and Company between Liverpool and the east coast of South America. In 1940 the British Admiralty requisitioned her and had her converted into an ocean boarding vessel. In 1941 a U-boat sank her in the Battle of the Atlantic, killing 20 of her crew.

This was the second of five Booth Line ships called Crispin. The first was a steamship that was built in 1907 and sunk by enemy action in 1917. The others were post-war cargo ships.

She was the first of two Royal Navy ships to have been called Crispin. The second  was a  destroyer that was launched in 1945 and sold in 1956.

Building
The Great Depression that began in 1929 caused a global slump in merchant shipping. Booth Line responded by renewing its fleet, selling 11 older ships and replacing them with a smaller number of new ones. Early in 1934 it ordered two cargo ships from Cammell, Laird of Birkenhead.  was launched on 11 October 1934 and completed that December. Her sister ship Crispin was launched on 7 December 1934 and completed in March 1935.

Crispin had a single propeller. Her main engine was a three-cylinder triple-expansion steam engine. Exhaust steam from its low-pressure cylinder powered a Bauer-Wach steam turbine, which drove the same propeller shaft via double-reduction gearing and a Föttinger fluid coupling.

Crispin was registered in Liverpool. Her UK official number was 164256 and her call sign was GYDZ.

Second World War civilian service
For the first 12 months of the Second World War Crispin continued her usual trade between Liverpool and various ports in Brazil. She began her outward voyages from Liverpool by sailing in OB (Outward Bound) convoys, each of which would disperse in the North Atlantic after a few days sailing.

For her homeward voyages to Liverpool Crispin usually went via the east coast of the US and Halifax, Nova Scotia, calling at New York and sometimes other ports, and then joining an HX convoy for her eastbound transatlantic crossing. In May 1940 Crispin instead returned from Brazil to Liverpool via Freetown in Sierra Leone, where she joined Convoy SL 31 to Liverpool.

Ocean boarding vessel
In August 1940 the Admiralty requisitioned Crispin, and she sailed from Liverpool around the north of Scotland to Middlesbrough to be converted into an ocean boarding vessel. Her DEMS armament was replaced with two 6-inch guns and an unspecified number of "light anti-aircraft guns". She was commissioned into the Royal Navy as HMS Crispin. Her commander was Acting Commander B Moloney, DSO, DSC, RNR.

On 31 January 1941 Crispin left Liverpool as one of the escorts of Convoy OB 280. On 3 February the convoy dispersed in the North Atlantic. Crispin headed for home along with the corvette , armed yacht Philante and rescue ship Copeland.

At 2333 hours that evening Crispin was north-northwest of Rockall when  hit her with one torpedo in her engine room. Crispin did not immediately sink, but 20 members of her crew, including A/Cdr Moloney and five of his officers, were killed. Copeland rescued eight of the survivors. Another of OB 280's escorts, the destroyer , rescued the remainder. On 4 February Crispin sank. All 121 survivors were landed at Liverpool.

See also

References

Bibliography
 

 

1934 ships
Cargo liners
Maritime incidents in February 1941
Ships of the Booth Steamship Company
Ships built on the River Mersey
World War II auxiliary ships of the United Kingdom
World War II merchant ships of the United Kingdom
World War II shipwrecks in the Atlantic Ocean